Global Change Biology is a biweekly peer-reviewed scientific journal covering research on the interface between biological systems and all aspects of environmental change that affect a substantial part of the globe including climate change, global warming, land use change, invasive species, urbanization, wildfire, and greenhouse gases. The editor-in-chief is Stephen P. Long, environmental plant physiologist, Fellow of the Royal Society and member of the National Academy of Sciences (University of Illinois and Lancaster University).

This journal has a sister journal: GCB Bioenergy: Bioproducts for a Sustainable Bioeconomy.

External links

Ecology journals
Environmental science journals
English-language journals
Wiley-Blackwell academic journals
Publications established in 1995

Biweekly journals